Todaraisingh is a city and a municipality and tehsil headquarters in Tonk district in the Indian state of Rajasthan. Banas River flows adjacent to it. It is of immense importance to the Rajasthan's Art and Heritage.

Todaraisingh is often simply called Toda.

Demographics
 India census, Todaraisingh had a population of 23,559. Males constitute 52% of the population and females 48%. Todaraisingh has an average literacy rate of 57%, lower than the national average of 59.5%: male literacy is 70%, and female literacy is 42%. In Todaraisingh, 18% of the population is under 6 years of age.

References

Cities and towns in Tonk district